The Hungarian Figure Skating Championships are a national figure skating competition held annually to determine the national champions of Hungary. Medals may be awarded in the disciplines of men's singles, ladies' singles, pair skating, and ice dancing.

Senior medalists
Men and ladies competed together between 1900 and 1922. Not every discipline has been held in every year due to a lack of competitors.

Men

Ladies

Pairs

Ice dancing

Junior medalists

Men

Ladies

Ice dancing

Advanced novice medalists

Ladies

References

External links

 Hungarian champions
 Hungarian Skating Federation

 
Figure skating national championships
Figure skating in Hungary
1900 establishments in Hungary
Recurring sporting events established in 1900